Nammanna is a 2005 Indian Kannada-language action-drama film directed by N. Shankar featuring Sudeep, Anjala Zaveri and Asha Saini in the lead roles. The film features background score and soundtrack composed by Gurukiran. The film released on 18 November 2005. This movie is dubbed in Telugu as Dowrjanyam. The film is a remake of the 1994 Telugu film Anna.

Plot synopsis
A youth suspected to be a Naxalite, leaves the rural land and moves to the city, where his brother is killed by a mafia don. The youth takes the matter into his hands, kills the don and serves the poor.

Cast
 Sudeep as Muttanna
 Anjala Zaveri as Anjali 
 Asha Saini as Rani 
 Kota Srinivasa Rao as Matka rajendra 
 Sadhu Kokila as press reporter 
 Subbaraju  as Marigudi 
 Ashish Vidyarthi 
 Ashok  as Lawyer 
 Mukhyamantri Chandru as Puttaraju 
 Kishori Ballal 
 Aravind 
Ghazal Khan
Kote Prabhakar
Shivaram 
Usha Bhandari 
Suthivelu
AVS
Karthik Sharma

Soundtrack

The film features background score and soundtrack composed by Gurukiran and lyrics by Jayant Kaikini, Kaviraj and Goturi.

References

External links
 

2005 films
2000s Kannada-language films
Indian action films
Films scored by Gurukiran
Kannada remakes of Telugu films
2005 action films